First Australians is an Australian historical documentary series produced by Blackfella Films over the course of six years, and first aired on SBS TV in October 2008. The documentary is part of a greater project that further consists of a book, a community outreach program and a substantial website featuring over 200 mini-documentaries.

Description
The series chronicles the history of contemporary Australia, from the perspective of its first people, Aboriginal Australians and Torres Strait Islander people. The series is essentially a synthesis of well-documented historical information. It relies heavily on archival documents and interpretations from historians and members of both the Aboriginal and European community and leaders. The story begins in 1788 in Sydney, with the arrival of the First Fleet and ends in 1993 with Koiki Mabo's legal challenge to the foundation of Australia.

The series comprises seven episodes in which it explores what unfolded when the oldest living culture in the world was confronted by the British Empire. It explores the lives of particular individuals and uses their stories as a vehicle to explain the larger situations of the time. It explains violent aspects of European settlement of Australia, such as killings, battles, wars, as well as acts of friendship and decency between the early European settlers and Aboriginal Australians. Aboriginal Australian history has until recently been clouded by the "great Australian silence", referring to ignorance of the real history of Australia seen as a way for non-Aboriginal Australians to hide shame for their own history.

The series was the winner of multiple awards, remains the highest-selling educational title in Australia , and was also sold overseas.

Episodes
A total of seven episodes were filmed. The series was first transmitted in Australia from 12 October to 2 November 2008.

Production
The series was made by Film Australia and the Film Finance Corporation in conjunction with SBS Independent and the New South Wales Film and Television Office. It was written, produced and directed by Rachel Perkins, daughter of outspoken Aboriginal activist Charles Perkins, with episode writing and directing credits including Beck Cole and Louis Nowra. The series was produced by Darren Dale.

The series featured writer Bruce Pascoe and historians Marcia Langton and Janet McCalman.

Community consultation
A significant part of the production of the series involved consultation with the descendants of the individuals portrayed in the documentary. According to the First Australians Documentary website, this involved; checking the content of scripts, usually face to face, seeking permission to film in particular locations, showing the rough cut of the film for comment and showing the film at fine cut. The series was made in accordance with Indigenous Cultural and Intellectual Property (ICIP) rights, to ensure the cultural content and the rights of Indigenous people.

Awards and nominations
2009: AFI Award: Best Documentary Series for Darren Dale, Rachel Perkins, Helen Panckhurst - Won
2009: Logie Award: Outstanding Documentary or Documentary Series - Won
2009: New South Wales Premier's Literary Awards Script Writing Award for Louis Nowra, Rachel Perkins & Beck Cole - Won
2009: Australian Directors' Guild Awards: Outstanding Direction for a Television Documentary - Series - (Freedom for Our Lifetime) for Rachel Perkins - Won
2009: Australian Writers' Guild Award: Outstanding Writing in a Documentary (Episode 1) for Louis Nowra, Rachel Perkins - Won
2009: Australian Writers' Guild Award: Outstanding Writing in a Documentary (Episode 3) for Louis Nowra, Beck Cole - Nominated
2009: Deadly Awards: Outstanding Achievement in Film - Rachel Perkins - Nominated

References

External links

First Australians website on SBS
First Australians at Creative Spirits
First Australians launch, on the Minister for Indigenous Affairs website

2000s Australian documentary television series
Special Broadcasting Service original programming
Television shows set in New South Wales
Documentary films about Aboriginal Australians
2008 Australian television series debuts
Indigenous Australian television series